Alan Jones (born 25 October 1946) is a British bobsledder. He competed in the four man event at the 1972 Winter Olympics.

References

1946 births
Living people
British male bobsledders
Olympic bobsledders of Great Britain
Bobsledders at the 1972 Winter Olympics
Place of birth missing (living people)